The 2022 United States House of Representatives elections in Mississippi were held on November 8, 2022, to elect the four U.S. representatives from the state of Mississippi, one from each of the state's four congressional districts. The elections coincided with other elections to the House of Representatives, elections to the United States Senate and various state and local elections.

The elections were the first under Mississippi's new congressional map after redistricting completed by the state government. All four races were considered uncompetitive in the general election and turnout from Mississippians was the lowest out of the entire United States, measuring in at 31.5%. Republican Representatives Michael Guest and Steven Palazzo faced competitive primaries, where both went to runoffs; Palazzo was ultimately ousted by Mike Ezell in the runoff, mainly in part to an investigation into Palazzo's supposed misuse of campaign funds. Republican Representative Trent Kelly was the sole representative of the Mississippi delegation to receive a Trump endorsement and faced no serious challenge. The partisan composition of the delegation remained the same after the election.

District 1

The 1st district takes in the northeastern area of the state, including Columbus, Oxford, Southaven, and Tupelo. The incumbent is Republican Trent Kelly, who was re-elected with 68.7% of the vote in 2020.

Republican primary

Candidates

Nominee
Trent Kelly, incumbent U.S. Representative

Eliminated in primary

Endorsements

Results

Democratic primary

Candidates

Nominee
Dianne Black, hair salon owner

Eliminated in primary
Hunter Kyle Avery, manufacturing worker

Results

Independents

Filed paperwork
James McCay

General election

Predictions

Results

District 2

The 2nd district encompasses the Mississippi Delta, taking in most of Jackson, the riverfront cities of Greenville and Vicksburg, and the interior market cities of Clarksdale, Greenwood and Clinton. The incumbent is Democrat Bennie Thompson, who was re-elected with 66.0% of the vote in 2020. Thompson cruised to re-election in 2022 as expected, though Brian Flowers did give him his toughest race since 2004 when Clinton LeSueur achieved 41% of the vote.

Democratic primary

Candidates

Nominee
Bennie Thompson, incumbent U.S. Representative

Eliminated in primary
Jerry Kerner, gun dealer

Endorsements

Results

Republican primary

Candidates

Nominee
Brian Flowers, nuclear plant technician, U.S. Navy veteran, and nominee for this district in 2020

Eliminated in runoff
Ron Eller, physician assistant and U.S. Army veteran

Eliminated in primary
Michael Carson
Stanford Johnson

Endorsements

Results

General election

Predictions

Results

District 3

The 3rd district is located in eastern and southwestern Mississippi, taking in Meridian, Starkville, Pearl, Natchez, and most of the wealthier portions of Jackson, including the portion of the city located in Rankin County. The incumbent is Republican Michael Guest, who was elected with 64.7% of the vote in 2020. Guest managed to flip Kemper County, which gave Joe Biden 61.02% of the vote in the 2020 presidential election.

Republican primary

Candidates

Nominee
Michael Guest, incumbent U.S. Representative

Eliminated in runoff
Michael Cassidy, U.S. Navy veteran

Eliminated in primary
Thomas Griffin, businessman

Results

Democratic primary

Candidates

Nominee
Shuwaski Young, political organizer

Withdrawn
Rahim Talley, businessman, Iraq war veteran and progressive activist

General election

Predictions

Results

District 4

The 4th district encompasses the Mississippi Gulf Coast, including Gulfport, Biloxi, Hattiesburg, Bay St. Louis, Laurel, and Pascagoula. The incumbent is Republican Steven Palazzo, who was re-elected unopposed in 2020.

Republican primary

Candidates

Nominee
Mike Ezell, Jackson County sheriff and former Ocean Springs police chief

Eliminated in runoff
Steven Palazzo, incumbent U.S. Representative

Eliminated in primary
Carl Boyanton, produce store owner and candidate for this district in 2020
Raymond Brooks, police officer
Kidron Peterson
Clay Wagner, banker
Brice Wiggins, state senator

Endorsements

Polling

Results

Democratic primary

Candidates

Nominee
Johnny DuPree, former Mayor of Hattiesburg; nominee for Governor of Mississippi in 2011 and Secretary of State of Mississippi in 2019

Eliminated in primary
David Sellers, pastor

Endorsements

Results

Libertarian primary

Candidates

Declared
Alden Patrick Johnson, firefighter

Independents

Candidates

Declared
Graham Hudson

General election

Predictions

Endorsements

Results

Notes

Partisan clients

References

External links
Official campaign websites for 1st district candidates
Mark Strauss (R) for Congress
Trent Kelly (R) for Congress

Official campaign websites for 2nd district candidates
Ron Eller (R) for Congress
Brian Flowers (R) for Congress
Jerry Kerner (D) for Congress
Bennie Thompson (D) for Congress

Official campaign websites for 3rd district candidates
Michael Cassidy (R) for Congress
Michael Guest (R) for Congress
Rahim Talley (D) for Congress
Shuwaski Young (D) for Congress

Official campaign websites for 4th district candidates
Carl Boyanton (R) for Congress
Raymond Brooks (R) for Congress
Johnny DuPree (D) for Congress
Mike Ezell (R) for Congress
Alden Patrick Johnson (L) for Congress
Steven Palazzo (R) for Congress
David Sellers (D) for Congress
Clay Wagner (R) for Congress
Brice Wiggins (R) for Congress

2022
Mississippi
United States House of Representatives